Haruna Yakubu (born 24 October 1955) is the Vice-Chancellor of University for Development Studies.

Education 
He obtained a Master of Science degree in Physics and Mathematics in 1984 and a Doctor of Philosophy degree in Semiconductor Physics in 1992, both at Moldova State University, Kishinev, Moldova, USSR.

Career 
Previous appointments include  Pro-Vice Chancellor of the University of Cape Coast, Chairman of the Governing Council of the Centre for Renewable Energy Studies (CRES), executive member – Ghana Solar Energy Society, fellow – Council for Advancement and Support for Education-UK, Associate Member – International Centre for Theoretical Physics (ICTP), and Member – Governing Council of the Foundation for Security and Development in Africa (FOSOA).

References

Living people
1955 births
Vice-Chancellors of the University for Development Studies
Moldova State University alumni
Dagomba people
Vice-Chancellors of universities in Ghana
Academic staff of the University for Development Studies